Abu al-Hasan Ali ibn Yaqteen ibn Musa al-Baghdadi (742–798) (Persian:ابوالحسن علی بن یقطین بن موسی البغدادی) was a close companion of Imam Musa al-Kadhim, a Shia narrator, jurist, and mutakallim. He was born in Kufa and lived in Baghdad. He was a reliable minister of Abbasid Caliphate, however he kept his faith hidden and used his position in the government administration to support the Shia who were usually oppressed during the Abbasid reign. He compiled 3 books.

Early life 
Ali ibn Yaqteen was born in 742 in Kufa. Since his father, was one of the supporters of Imam Ja'far al-Sadiq, he was placed under an arrest warrant by Marwan I. Therefore, he was forced to escape and hide, and Ali ibn Yaqteen's mother took him and his brother, Ubayd, to Medina. Later on, he moved to Baghdad and started working as a spice seller.

Entering Abbasid government 
After the fall of the Umayyad Caliphate and emergence of Abbasid Caliphate, Ali ibn Yaqteen returned to Kufa and entered the Abbasid administration. He got promoted when Al-Hadi took over the reign. He was even entrusted with the special Caliph ring and seal. In the long run, he became a minister of Harun al-Rashid.

Faith 
Undoubtedly he was a Shia; but he hid his belief from Abbasid Caliphs all the time as his father did. He was a close student and companion to Musa al-Kadhim and acted as Musa al-Kadhim's secret agent in the palace of Harun al-Rashid. Many Hadiths have been narrated from him in The Four Books. According to some historical evidence that have been given credence by Shia scholars, he entered the Abbasid government by the approval and guidance of Musa al-Kadhim in order to support the oppressed people and particularly assist the Shia.

Works
In biographical evaluation sources, three books have been mentioned for him:
 Masa’il anhu al-Sadiq min al-Malahim (about the future events and occurrence)
 Al-Shakk bi hadratih-I (about a disputation between a doubting Thomas and Ja'far al-Sadiq)
 Masa’il ‘an Abi al-Hasan Musa ibn Ja’far (contains the hadiths that he had heard from Musa al-Kadhim or Imam's answers to his questions)

Death 
In 798 Ali ibn Yaqteen died in Baghdad while Musa al-Kadhim was imprisoned by Harun al-Rashid.

References 

742 births
798 deaths
Officials of the Abbasid Caliphate
Muslim scholars of Islamic jurisprudence
People from Kufa
Shia Muslims